Poland will compete at the 2011 Summer Universiade in Shenzhen, China.

Medalists

Basketball

Poland has qualified a women's team.

Group C

Classification 9th-16th Place

Classification 13th-16th Place

Volleyball

Poland has qualified a women's team.

Group C

|}

|}

Quarterfinals

|}

Classification 5-8 places

|}

Final 5-6 places

|}

References

2011 in Polish sport
Nations at the 2011 Summer Universiade
2011